Home from Home is a 1939 British comedy drama film directed by Herbert Smith and starring Sandy Powell, Rene Ray and Peter Gawthorne. It follows a man who struggles to cope with life after being released from prison.

Cast
 Sandy Powell - Sandy
 Rene Ray - Gladys Burton
 Roy Emerton - Bill Burton
 Kathleen Harrison - Mabel
 Bruce Lester - Jim
 Wally Patch - Banks
 Norma Varden - Mrs. Fairweather
 Peter Gawthorne - Governor
 The Five Harmonica Rascals - Musical Ensemble
 The Gaillard Brothers - Musical Ensemble

Critical reception
TV Guide rated it two out of five stars, calling it a "Decent farce," and concluding that "Powell is the whole show, supplying an array of laughs."

References

External links

1939 films
1939 comedy-drama films
Films directed by Herbert Smith
British comedy-drama films
British black-and-white films
1930s English-language films
1930s British films